Ganesh Chandra Haldar is a Bangladesh Nationalist Party politician and a Member of Parliament from Madaripur-3.

Career
Haldar was elected to parliament from Madaripur-3 as an Bangladesh Nationalist Party candidate in February 1996.

References

Bangladesh Nationalist Party politicians
Date of birth missing (living people)
6th Jatiya Sangsad members